Parashorea tomentella is a species of plant in the family Dipterocarpaceae. It is endemic to eastern Borneo (Sabah and east Kalimantan). It is a large emergent tree, up to 65 m tall, found in lowland dipterocarp forests on fertile clay soils. It is a light hardwood sold under the trade names of  White Lauan or White Seraya. It is found in forest reserves on the east coast of Sabah.

References

tomentella
Endemic flora of Borneo
Trees of Borneo